Gennadi Tumat (1964–1996) was a renowned Tuvinian master of throat singing.

See also

1964 births
1996 deaths
Throat singing
Tuvan people
20th-century Russian singers